The 24th Independent Spirit Awards, honoring the best in independent filmmaking for 2008, were announced on February 21, 2009.  It was hosted by Steve Coogan.

Winners and nominees 

{| class="wikitable"
!Best Feature
!Best Director
|-
|The Wrestler

Ballast
Frozen River
Rachel Getting Married
Wendy and Lucy
|Tom McCarthy – The Visitor

Ramin Bahrani – Chop Shop
Jonathan Demme – Rachel Getting Married
Lance Hammer – Ballast
Courtney Hunt – Frozen River
|-
!Best Male Lead
!Best Female Lead
|-
|Mickey Rourke – The Wrestler

Javier Bardem – Vicky Cristina Barcelona
Richard Jenkins – The Visitor
Sean Penn – Milk
Jeremy Renner – The Hurt Locker
|Melissa Leo – Frozen River

Summer Bishil – Towelhead
Anne Hathaway – Rachel Getting Married
Tarra Riggs – Ballast
Michelle Williams – Wendy and Lucy
|-
!Best Supporting Male
!Best Supporting Female
|-
|James Franco – Milk

Anthony Mackie – The Hurt Locker
Charlie McDermott – Frozen River
Jim Myron Ross – Ballast
Haaz Sleiman – The Visitor
|Penélope Cruz – Vicky Cristina Barcelona

Rosemarie DeWitt – Rachel Getting Married
Rosie Perez – The Take
Misty Upham – Frozen River
Debra Winger – Rachel Getting Married
|-
!Best Screenplay
!Best First Screenplay
|-
|Vicky Cristina Barcelona – Woody AllenSangre de Mi Sangre – Christopher Zalla
Savage Grace – Howard A. Rodman
Sugar – Anna Boden and Ryan Fleck
Synecdoche, New York – Charlie Kaufman
|Milk – Dustin Lance BlackBallast – Lance Hammer
Frozen River – Courtney Hunt
Rachel Getting Married – Jenny Lumet
The Wackness – Jonathan Levine
|-
!Best First Feature
!Best Documentary
|-
|Synecdoche, New York

Afterschool
Medicine for Melancholy
Sangre de Mi Sangre
Sleep Dealer
|Man on Wire

The Betrayal
Encounters at the End of the World
The Order of Myths
Up the Yangtze
|-
!Best Cinematography
!Best Foreign Film
|-
|The Wrestler – Maryse AlbertiBallast – Lol Crawley
Chop Shop – Michael Simmonds
Medicine for Melancholy – James Laxton
Milk – Harris Savides
| The Class • FranceGomorrah • Italy
Hunger • Ireland/UK
The Secret of the Grain • France
Silent Light • Mexico/France/Netherlands/Germany
|}

 Films with multiple nominations and awards 

 Special Awards 

John Cassavetes AwardIn Search of a Midnight Kiss
Prince of Broadway
The Signal
Take Out
Turn the River

Truer Than Fiction Award
The Order of Myths
Anvil! The Story of Anvil
Loot

Producers Award
Heather Rae – Frozen River and Ibid
Lars Knudsen and Jay Van Hoy – Treeless Mountain and I'll Come Running
Jason Orans – Goodbye Solo and Year of the Fish

Someone to Watch Award
Lynn Shelton – My Effortless Brilliance
Barry Jenkins – Medicine for Melancholy
Nina Paley – Sita Sings the Blues

Robert Altman Award
Synecdoche, New York — Charlie Kaufman, Jeanne McCarthy, Hope Davis, Philip Seymour Hoffman, Jennifer Jason Leigh, Catherine Keener, Samantha Morton, Tom Noonan, Emily Watson, Dianne Wiest and Michelle Williams

External links 
2008 Spirit Awards at IMDb
Official show on YouTube

References

2008
Independent Spirit Awards